Oospila is a genus of moths in the family Geometridae described by Warren in 1897.

Species
In alphabetical order:
Oospila acymanta (Prout, 1933)
Oospila albicoma (Felder & Rogenhofer, 1875)
Oospila albipunctulata (Prout, 1932)
Oospila altonaria E. D. Jones, 1921
Oospila arpata (Schaus, 1897)
Oospila asmura (Druce, 1892)
Oospila astigma (Warren, 1907)
Oospila athena (Druce, 1892)
Oospila atopochlora Prout, 1933
Oospila atroviridis Warren, 1904
Oospila callicula (Druce, 1892)
Oospila camilla Schaus, 1913
Oospila carnelunata (Warren, 1906)
Oospila ciliaria (Hübner, 1823)
Oospila circumsessa Prout, 1917
Oospila circumsignata Prout, 1916
Oospila concinna Warren, 1900
Oospila confluaria (Warren, 1906)
Oospila confundaria (Moschler, 1890)
Oospila congener Warren, 1900
Oospila continuata (Warren, 1906)
Oospila decoloraria (Walker, 1861)
Oospila decorata (Prout, 1932)
Oospila delacruzi (Dognin, 1898)
Oospila delphinata (Warren, 1900)
Oospila depressa Warren, 1905
Oospila dicraspeda Prout, 1932
Oospila ecuadorata (Dognin, 1892)
Oospila euchlora (Prout, 1932)
Oospila excrescens (Warren, 1906)
Oospila fimbripedata (Warren, 1907)
Oospila flavilimes (Warren, 1904)
Oospila florepicta (Warren, 1906)
Oospila granulata (Warren, 1909)
Oospila holochroa (Prout, 1913)
Oospila hyalina Warren, 1897
Oospila immaculata Cook & Scoble, 1995
Oospila includaria (Herrich-Schäffer, 1855)
Oospila jaspidata (Warren, 1897)
Oospila lactecincta (Warren, 1909)
Oospila lacteguttata (Warren, 1909)
Oospila leucostigma (Warren, 1907)
Oospila leucothalera (Prout, 1932)
Oospila lilacina (Warren, 1906)
Oospila longipalpis (Warren, 1906)
Oospila longiplaga Warren, 1909
Oospila lunicincta (Warren, 1909)
Oospila marginata Warren, 1897
Oospila miccularia (Guenée, 1857)
Oospila nigripunctata (Warren, 1909)
Oospila nivetacta (Warren, 1906)
Oospila obeliscata (Warren, 1906)
Oospila obsolescens Prout, 1932
Oospila pallidaria (Schaus, 1897)
Oospila pellucida Prout, 1916
Oospila permagna (Warren, 1909)
Oospila quinquemaculata (Warren, 1906)
Oospila rhodophragma Prout, 1916
Oospila rosipara (Warren, 1897)
Oospila rubescens (Warren, 1906)
Oospila rufilimes (Warren, 1905)
Oospila ruptimacula Warren, 1901
Oospila sellifera Warren, 1906
Oospila semispurcata (Warren, 1906)
Oospila sporadata (Warren, 1906)
Oospila stagonata (Felder & Rogenhofer, 1875)
Oospila subaurea (Warren, 1907)
Oospila thalassina Warren, 1905
Oospila tricamerata Prout, 1916
Oospila trilunaria (Guenée, 1857)
Oospila venezuelata (Walker, 1861)
Oospila violacea Warren, 1897
Oospila zamaradaria D. S. Fletcher, 1952

References

Geometrinae
Geometridae genera